Elephants are an integral part of the Mysore Dasara Festival. The elephants form the core of the Mysore Dasara procession on the Vijayadashami day. The lead elephant carries the Golden Howdah (Chinnada Ambari) with the Goddess Chamundeshwari in it.
The Golden Howdah weighs 750 Kilograms  in weight and is purely made of gold.

Arrival
The Elephants start arriving to Mysore city in groups. They arrive to Mysore a month or so before the start of the actual festivities and they undergo practice for their march on the final day. The elephants are accompanied by their respective keepers or Mahouts. The elephants are usually brought in trucks and are occasionally walked the 70-km distance from their home base in the Nagarahole National Park to Mysore. Villagers greet the sacred animals all along their designated trekking route. As each party of pachyderms arrives at the Veerana Hosahalli forest checkpost in Hunsur taluk, from the forest, they are received by the District  Minister, a host of officials and prominent persons from Mysore and people from nearby villages. The villagers perform folk dances, and beat drums and sing songs to welcome the elephants. This in keeping with the royal tradition of the Mysore Maharajas.

Royal feast
While in their respective camps the elephants are served 'Ragi mudde', a mixture of ragi and horse gram and fodder branches. But when they are royal guests in the royal city of Mysore preparing for Dasara, they are served with ‘royal’ food till the grand Dasara finale - Jamboo Savari. The elephants get to eat uddina bele (black gram), green gram, wheat, boiled rice, onion and vegetables in the mornings and evenings. They get rice, groundnut, coconut, jaggery and sugarcane with some salt to add taste to the diet after they return from their regular rehearsals. This food is served twice a day. They also get branch fodder like banyan leaves. Extra care is taken while serving food to the jumbos. High-calorie and protein-rich food is served to the elephants to improve their physical fitness. They carry a lot of weight at the procession and for that, they need strength. Hence they are fed with rich food. The food served in the morning is laced with pure butter for flavour. Besides nutritious food, vitamin doses are also injected so as to balance the diet. An elephant eats 400 kilograms of fodder in a day in the forests. The food served to them in Mysore contains high calories and is more than what they eat in the jungles.

Choosing the elephants

The Dasara Elephants are usually caught by the elephant trainers via the Khedda operation. During the Wodeyar rule, the elephants thus caught were inspected in an open field  for strength, personality, and character. The walking styles, weaknesses to seduction, the facial charisma were some of the factors considered for selection. Then the chosen elephants were trained for the festival. It is said that the king himself would oversee the training. Sometimes abandoned young elephants are also trained for dasara.

The abode
The abode of the elephants during the rest of the year is usually their training camps and the surrounding National Parks. There are around 70 tamed elephants in exclusive camps at Dubare, Hebballa, Moorkal, Kallalla, Nagarahole, Veeranahosahalli, Metikuppe, Sunkadakatte, Bandipur, Moolehole, K. Gudi and Bheemeshwari. About 240 mahouts and kavadis take care of the needs of these elephants and develop a bond with them.

The elephants

The elephants are named in Kannada and usually have the names of Hindu gods and historical figures. Elephants Drona and Balarama carried the idol of deity Chamundeshwari housed in the Golden Howdah for a combined total of 30 years. Balarama took up the responsibility after Drona was electrocuted in 1998 at Nagarahole National Park. Balarama has been granted retirement after 13 years. The 52-year-old Arjuna replaced Balarama and carried the Golden Howdah during the Dasara 2012 Jamboo Sawari procession at Mysore on 24 October 2012. The other elephants participating in the event are Bharatha, Kanthi, Gayathri, Kokila, Sri Rama, Abhimanyu, Gajendra, Biligiriranga, Vikram, Varalakshmi, and Sarojini.

Controversy
The Dasara procession has faced increasing pressure from activists and campaigners to end its controversial use of elephants. Procession elephants, as well as their handlers known as ‘mahouts’, have died from several shocking incidents over the years.

In 2018, leaked footage from the elephants’ training ground showed an elephant swaying in distress. International press labelled the video “heartbreaking”, and reported on how the elephants must undergo two months of “rigorous training” in order to perform in the procession.

References

External links
Mysoresamachar
Potpuri
Hindu News

Hindu traditions
Religious festivals in India
Festivals in Karnataka
Elephants in Indian culture
Culture of Mysore
Elephant festivals